Ray Broadway (born 26 January 1938) is  a former Australian rules footballer who played with Footscray and South Melbourne in the Victorian Football League (VFL).

Notes

External links 		
		
		
		
		
		

1938 births	
Living people	
Australian rules footballers from Victoria (Australia)		
Western Bulldogs players		
Sydney Swans players